Almas Hospital is a health care facility in Kottakkal, Kerala, India. It is a 400-bed hospital with 24-hour laboratory, medical lab and scanning services.

References

External links
 Official website

Hospitals in Kerala
Buildings and structures in Malappuram district
Year of establishment missing